Scardamia metallaria is a moth of the family Geometridae first described by Achille Guenée in 1858. It is found in Sri Lanka, India and Australia.

Host plants of caterpillar include Flacourtia species.

References

Moths of Asia
Moths described in 1858